Novoabzakovo (Yañı Abźaq) is a rural locality (a selo) in Abzakovsky Selsoviet, Beloretsky District, Bashkortostan, Russia. The population was 295 as of 2010. There are 22 streets.

Geography 
Novoabzakovo is located 27 km southeast of Beloretsk (the district's administrative centre) by road. Abzakovo is the nearest rural locality.

References 

Rural localities in Beloretsky District